Sleep Cycle is the debut solo album by Animal Collective member Deakin (Josh Dibb), released on Bandcamp on April 6, 2016. That same day, "Just Am" was the first track shared from the album, accompanied by a music video. The album was subsequently released on My Animal Home on April 8, 2016. It was remastered and reissued by Domino in 2019.

Background
Dibb originally started raising funds for Sleep Cycle through a Kickstarter campaign in 2009. Dibb intended to use the funds to perform at the Festival au Désert in Mali, Africa, the creation of a book and CD, and a charitable donation to Temedt, a Mali organization working to help enslaved black Tuareg people. Dibb's Kickstarter campaigned amassed 205 backers who pledged $25,985 to help bring the project to life. All the funds that were raised through the Kickstarter campaign were eventually donated to charity and the album was ultimately self-funded by Dibb.

Reception
The album received acclaim from critics. At Metacritic, which assigns a normalized rating out of 100 to reviews from critics, the album has received an average score of 84, indicating "universal acclaim", based on 6 reviews.

Track listing

Personnel
 Deakin – recording (1-3, 5), mixing (1-5), artwork
 Dutch E Germ (Tim DeWit) – drums (4), samples (6)
 Nicolas Vernhes – recording (4, 6), mixing (4)
 Sonic Boom – mixing (6)
 Greg St. Pierre – artwork
 Rob Carmichael – artwork

References

Further reading 

 

2016 debut albums
Deakin (musician) albums
Domino Recording Company albums
Kickstarter-funded albums